The 2006 Bulgarian Figure Skating Championships were the National Championships of the 2005–06 figure skating season. Skaters competed in the disciplines of men's singles, ladies' singles, pair skating, and ice dancing on the senior level.

The results were used to choose the teams to the 2006 Winter Olympics, the 2006 World Championships, and the 2006 European Championships.

Results

Men

Ladies

* Manuela Stanukova won the Junior national title, and the ISU recognizes her as the senior bronze medalist.

Pairs

Ice dancing

External links
 results

Bulgarian Figure Skating Championships, 2006